There are at least 126 named lakes and reservoirs in Ravalli County, Montana.

Lakes
 Aichele Lake, el. 
 Alpine Lakes, el. 
 Bailey Lake, el. 
 Baker Lake, el. 
 Bear Lake, el. 
 Big Creek Lakes, el. 
 Big Grizzly Lake, el. 
 Boulder Lake, el. 
 Bryan Lake, el. 
 Buck Lake, el. 
 Burnt Fork Lake, el. 
 Burrell Lake, el. 
 Camas Lake, el. 
 Canyon Lake, el. 
 Capri Lake, el. 
 Carmine Lake, el. 
 Cave Lake, el. 
 Chaffin Lake, el. 
 Charity Lake, el. 
 Dollar Lake, el. 
 East Lake, el. 
 Elk Lake, el. 
 Esplin Lake, el. 
 Faith Lake, el. 
 Fish Lake, el. 
 Fish Lake, el. 
 Fool Hen Lake, el. 
 Frog Pond Lake, el. 
 Garrard Lake, el. 
 Gem Lake, el. 
 Glen Lake, el. 
 Goat Lake, el. 
 Hackney Lake, el. 
 Hart Lake, el. 
 Hauf Lake, el. 
 Heinrich Lake, el. 
 Hidden Lake, el. 
 Hidden Lake, el. 
 Hope Lake, el. 
 Hope Lake, el. 
 Ingomar Lake, el. 
 Jerry Lake, el. 
 Jerusalem Lake, el. 
 Kelly Lake, el. 
 Kent Lake, el. 
 Kerlee Lake, el. 
 Kidney Lake, el. 
 Knaack Lake, el. 
 Kneaves Lake, el. 
 Kock Lake, el. 
 Kramis Pond, el. 
 Lake Capitan, el. 
 Lake Crystal, el. 
 Lake of the Rocks, el. 
 Lake Turbid, el. 
 Lappi Lake, el. 
 Little Burnt Fork Lakes, el. 
 Little Grizzly Lake, el. 
 Little Rock Creek Lake, el. 
 Lockwood Lake, el. 
 Lomo Lake, el. 
 Lookout Lake, el. 
 Lost Horse Lake, el. 
 Middle Fork Lakes, el. 
 Middle Lake, el. 
 Milepost Lake, el. 
 Mills Lake, el. 
 Mink Lake, el. 
 Mud Lake, el. 
 Mudhole Lake, el. 
 Nelson Lake, el. 
 North Kootenai Lake, el. 
 North Totem Lake, el. 
 Park Lake, el. 
 Pass Lake, el. 
 Pearl Lake, el. 
 Peterson Lake, el. 
 Piquett Lake, el. 
 Ripple Lake, el. 
 Saint Mary Lake, el. 
 Shadow Lake, el. 
 Shannon Lake, el. 
 Shelf Lake, el. 
 Slate Lake, el. 
 South Bear Lake, el. 
 South Fork Lake, el. 
 South Fork Lakes, el. 
 South Kootenai Lake, el. 
 Sweeney Lake, el. 
 Tag Alder Lake, el. 
 Tamarack Lake, el. 
 Tenmile Lake, el. 
 Totem Peak Lake, el. 
 Trapper Lake, el. 
 Trout Lake, el. 
 Twelvemile Lake, el. 
 Twin Lakes, el. 
 Two Lakes, el. 
 Watchtower Lake, el. 
 White Lake, el.

Reservoirs
 Bass Lake, el. 
 Big Creek Lake, el. 
 Blodgett Lake, el. 
 Burnt Fork Lake, el. 
 Canyon Lake, el. 
 Dam Creek Lake, el. 
 Duffy Lake, el. 
 Fish Lake, el. 
 Fred Burr Lake, el. 
 Fred Burr Reservoir, el. 
 Gleason Lake, el. 
 Hauf Lake, el. 
 High Lake, el. 
 Holloway Lake, el. 
 Lake Como, el. 
 Lower Twin Lake, el. 
 Mill Lake, el. 
 Painted Rocks Lake, el. 
 Schoolmarm Lake, el. 
 Sears Lake, el. 
 Stevensville Reservoir, el. 
 Tamarack Lake, el. 
 Tin Cup Lake, el. 
 Tin Cup Lake, el. 
 Upper Twin Lake, el. 
 Wyant Lake, el.

See also
 List of lakes in Montana

Notes

Bodies of water of Ravalli County, Montana
Ravalli